Florent Couao-Zotti (born 1964) is a writer of comics, plays, and short stories, who lives in Cotonou, Benin. He is fond of employing the short-story as a form. He is also editor of several satirical magazines and a cultural columnist.

Publications
This list is incomplete: please add to it.
 Ce soleil où j’ai toujours soif (play). 1996. 
 Notre pain de chaque jour (play). 1998: Le Serpent à plumes, Paris. 
 L'homme dit fou et la mauvaise foi des hommes (short stories). 2000: Le Serpent à plumes, Paris. 
 Notre pain de chaque nuit (novel). 2000: J'ai lu, Paris. 
 Charly en guerre (youth novel). 2001: Éditions Dapper, 2001. 
 La diseuse de mal-espérance (play). 2001. 
 Small hell in Street corners, (short story in Fools, Thieves and other Dreamers). 2001: Weaver Press, Harare.
 La Sirène qui embrassait les étoiles. 2003: L'œil, Paris. 
 Le collectionneur de vierges (play). 2004: Editions Ndzé. 
 Le Cantique des cannibales. 2004: Le Serpent à plumes, Paris. 
 Retour de tombe. 2004: Editions Joca Seria. 
 Les Fantômes du Brésil. 2006: UBU éditions. 
 2070 en Sexe Exquis
 Si la cour du mouton est sale, ce n'est pas au porc de le dire. (roman noir) 2010: Editions du Rocher. 
 Western Tchoukoutou. 2018: Editions Gallimard.

References

Beninese dramatists and playwrights
1964 births
Living people
Beninese male short story writers
Beninese short story writers
Beninese novelists
20th-century dramatists and playwrights
21st-century dramatists and playwrights
20th-century novelists
21st-century novelists
Male dramatists and playwrights
Male novelists
20th-century short story writers
21st-century short story writers
20th-century male writers
21st-century male writers
20th-century Beninese writers
21st-century Beninese writers